The Leelavati Award is an award for outstanding contribution to public outreach in mathematics. It is named after the 12th-century mathematical treatise "Lilavati" devoted to arithmetic and algebra written by the Indian mathematician Bhāskara II, also known as Bhaskara Achārya. In the book the author posed, in verse form, a series of problems in (elementary) arithmetic to one Leelavati (perhaps his daughter) and followed them up with hints to solutions. This work appears to have been the main source of learning arithmetic and algebra in medieval India. The work was also translated into Persian and was influential in West Asia.

History

The Leelavati Prize was handed out for the first time at the closing ceremony of the International Congress of Mathematicians (ICM) 2010 in Hyderabad, India. Established by the Executive Organising Committee (EOC) of the ICM with the endorsement of the IMU Executive Committee (EC), the Leelavati Prize was initiated as a one-time international award for outstanding public outreach work for mathematics. The award was so well received at the conference and in the mathematical press  that the IMU decided to turn the prize into a recurring four-yearly award and the award ceremony a regular feature of every ICM closing ceremony.

The Leelavati prize is not intended to reward mathematical research but rather outreach activities in the broadest possible sense. It carries a cash prize of 1,000,000 Indian Rupees ( US dollars) together with a citation, and is sponsored by Infosys since 2014.

Laureates

See also

 List of mathematics awards

References

External links
Leelavati Prize - IMU website

Awards of the International Mathematical Union
Awards established in 2010